Yves Arones Dignadice (born December 18, 1964) is a Filipino former professional basketball player who spent fourteen seasons in the Philippine Basketball Association, mostly with the San Miguel Beermen.

Early life and career

Yves was born and raised in Jaro, Iloilo City. A pick-up from the Visayan cage recruit. His first taste of competitive basketball was when he participated in a community tournament. After doing time with a Chinese high school, the 6-4 slotman transferred to the West Negros College in Bacolod. Even though he was only in High School, Yves showed a brand of play good enough to earn him a slot with the Western Visayas Regional Athletic Association selection (Region VI) that participated in the 1983 Palarong Pambansa held in Tacloban, Leyte.

It was playing against the De La Salle team that coach Pilo Pumaren and "Boss Henry" Cojuangco spotted him and marked him down as a possible De La Salle recruit. In May of that same year, Yves was transported to the mainland to take part in the first-ever PABL tournament as a Taft-based Green Archer. A month later, he joined the training camp of Ron Jacobs with the aspirations of making it with the RP squad to be sent to Hong Kong ABC. Unfortunately, coach Jacobs felt that Yves was still too raw to meet the demands of a tough tournament and was cut from the final selection.

In early 1984, when the call for national team aspirants to the Asian Youth tournament was announced, Yves pounced on the opportunity to sharpen his skills. He passed the requirements and underwent rigid preparations for the biennial competitions. Together with Negrense buddy, Naning Valenciano, they helped steer the RP squad to a third-place finish in Seoul, Korea. By that time, the Northern Consolidated contingent of Ron Jacobs was already showing a lot of muscle in the PBA.

Professional career

With his good looks, Dignadice became an instant darling amongst female basketball fans.  But on the court, this basketball adonis was an exceptional defensive player.  With his long arms and quick feet, Dignadice could guard all five positions and was a terror when it came to protecting the paint, always forcing his opponents to take awkward shots.  His defensive capabilities gave him three All-Star invites and, more importantly, inclusion in the first ever national basketball team composed of PBA players in 1990 Asian Games, purportedly as coach Robert Jaworski's personal choice.  He was also an integral part of the San Miguel franchise’s Grand Slam run in 1989.

His stock fell off the grid as the 90s came because of various injuries. Unlike contemporary Jerry Codiñera, he never really had a firm grasp on the starting PF/C spot, and it didn't help him that he had the more illustrious Ramon Fernandez as his teammate and the team's main man. He was the last part of the Grand Slam squad to leave the Beermen when he was assigned to Ginebra a year before his eventual retirement.

After his retirement, he left the Philippines and is currently residing in the US.

National team career

Dignadice was a member of two Philippine national teams: the first one was with the NCC-backed national team that won the gold medal during the 1985 ABC Championship (now FIBA Asia) in Kuala Lumpur, and second with the all-pro Philippine squad that won silver during the 1990 Asian Games in Beijing.

References

1963 births
Living people
Asian Games medalists in basketball
Asian Games silver medalists for the Philippines
Barangay Ginebra San Miguel players
Basketball players at the 1990 Asian Games
Basketball players from Iloilo
Centers (basketball)
Medalists at the 1990 Asian Games
Philippine Basketball Association All-Stars
Philippine Basketball Association players with retired numbers
Philippines men's national basketball team players
Filipino men's basketball players
Power forwards (basketball)
San Miguel Beermen players
Sportspeople from Iloilo City
De La Salle Green Archers basketball players